Circle of Fifth is a Japanese pop music studio album produced by Shinji Orito featuring nine vocalists. It was released on October 24, 2012 by Key Sounds Label in two discs. The album peaked at No. 81 on the Japanese Oricon weekly albums chart.


Track listing

References

External links
 

2012 albums
Key Sounds Label